Honeyville is an unincorporated community in Page County, in the U.S. state of Virginia. It is located in between Alma, Virginia and Stanley, Virginia.

References

Unincorporated communities in Virginia
Unincorporated communities in Page County, Virginia